Highway 22 is a north-south highway that provides quick access from the city of Castlegar to the Canada-U.S. border.  When the highway was first opened in 1964, it only went as far north from the border as Rossland. Highways 3 and 3B followed the present-day routing of Highway 22 north of Rossland at the time Highway 22 was first opened. The route north of Rossland was given to Highway 22 in 1979. The number of the highway is derived from then-Washington State Route 22 (renumbered to Route 25 in 1964), which Highway 22 meets at the border.

Route details
The total distance covered by Highway 22 is 47 km (29 mi). It begins at the Canada-U.S. border at a location known as Paterson. From Paterson, Highway 22 goes north for 11 km (7 mi) to Rossland, where it meets Highway 3B. Highway 3B then carries Highway 22 east for 10 km (6 mi) to Trail where Highway 3B diverges east. Highway 22 then follows the Columbia River north for 26 km (16 mi) to where it meets the Crowsnest Highway at Castlegar.

Major intersections

References

External links
 Official Numbered Routes in British Columbia by British Columbia Driving & Transportation

022